Jacques François Rosart (1714, Namur – 26 May 1777) was a Belgian engraver and founder of metal type.

Rosart operated a successful type foundry in Brussels after arriving in the city in 1759, and before that worked in Haarlem. His typefaces were in the "transitional" style, and he also made script typefaces, which he called a Financière style, music typefaces and shadowed capitals.

Digital typefaces based on Rosart's work have been published.

References

Cited literature

External links 
Rosart's type specimens:
Epreuve des caractères qui se gravent et fondent dans la nouvelle fonderie de Jacques François Rosart, 1761
Epreuve des caractères qui se gravent & fondent dans la nouvelle fonderie de Jacques François Rosart, 1768
Epreuves des caractères de la fonderie de la Veuve Decellier, successeur de J. F. Rosart, 1779

1714 births
1777 deaths
People from Namur (city)
Businesspeople of the Austrian Netherlands
Belgian typographers and type designers
Businesspeople from Brussels
Transitional serif typefaces